Tetrasphaera  is a bacterial genus from the family of Intrasporangiaceae.

References

Further reading 
 
 
 

Intrasporangiaceae
Bacteria genera